The men's 67.5 kg weightlifting competitions at the 1964 Summer Olympics in Tokyo took place on 13 October at the Shibuya Public Hall. It was the tenth appearance of the lightweight class.

Results

References

Weightlifting at the 1964 Summer Olympics